Sarcochilus argochilus, commonly known as the northern lawyer orchid, is a small epiphytic orchid endemic to Queensland. It has up to eight thin leaves and up to twelve small bright green to yellowish green flowers with a white labellum.

Description
The labellum has three lobes, the side lobes erect and the middle lobe with a short tooth. Flowering occurs between June and December.

Taxonomy and naming
Sarcochilus argochilus was first formally described in 2006 by David Jones and Mark Clements and the description was published in Australian Orchid Review from a specimen collected in the Eungella National Park.

Distribution and habitat
The northern lawyer orchid grows on trees and vines in rainforest and other humid places. It is found in Queensland between the Mount Lewis National Park and Toowoomba.

References

Endemic orchids of Australia
Orchids of Queensland
Plants described in 2006
argochilus